Gakenke district is one among thirty district made of Rwanda. It's located in Northern Province of this country (Rwanda).This district has started implementing a building plan with demarcation for land usage and public facilities.

Sectors 
Gakenke district is divided into 19 sectors: Busengo, Coko, Cyabingo, Gakenke, Gashenyi, Mugunga, Janja, Kamubuga, Karambo, Kivuruga, Mataba, Minazi, Muhondo, Muyongwe, Muzo, Nemba, Ruli, Rusasa and Rushashi.

References 
 
 Inzego.doc — Province, District and Sector information from MINALOC, the Rwanda ministry of local government.

Northern Province, Rwanda
Districts of Rwanda